The 2019–20 Bermudian Premier Division is the 57th season of the Bermudian Premier Division, the highest tier of football in Bermuda. The season began on 21 September 2019 and was scheduled to conclude on 22 March 2020. However, the final round was postponed due to the COVID-19 pandemic. On 27 May, the final round was cancelled and all remaining matches were awarded as 0-0 draws.

Teams

Team changes

To Premier Division
Promoted from the 2018–19 First Division
 Southampton Rangers
 Somerset Eagles

From Premier Division
Withdrew from the league
 BAA Wanderers

Relegated to the 2019–20 First Division
 Paget Lions

Stadia and locations

Source:

League table

Results

Top scorers

Source:

References

External links
Bermuda Football Association 

2019-20
Bermuda
1